"Ruby, Don't Take Your Love to Town" is a song written by Mel Tillis about a paralyzed veteran who lies helplessly as his wife "paints [herself] up" to go out for the evening without him; he believes she is going in search of a lover. As he hears the door slam behind her, he claims that he would murder her if he could move to get his gun, and pleads for her to reconsider. A line in the song about a "crazy Asian war" and the time of the song's release led to the assumption the song was about a veteran of the Vietnam War, though this was never stated in the lyrics. However, Tillis stated that the song was about a veteran of World War II.

"Ruby" was first recorded by Waylon Jennings in 1966. Johnny Darrell reached number nine on the country charts with the song in 1967, and Kenny Rogers and The First Edition released it in 1969.

Chart performance

The First Edition version

In 1969, after the success Kenny Rogers and The First Edition had enjoyed with the hits "Just Dropped In (To See What Condition My Condition Was In)" and "But You Know I Love You," Rogers wanted to take his group more into a country music direction. They recorded their version of the song, with Rogers singing the lead, in a single take. The record became an international hit for them, reaching number two in the UK Singles Chart and staying in the top-ten for 12 weeks. In the United States it reached number six on the Billboard Hot 100 and number 39 on the country chart.

In 1977, now performing solo after the First Edition disbanded in early 1976, Rogers made re-recordings of this, and a number of other First Edition hits, for his 1977 greatest hits package Ten Years of Gold. (It was later issued in the UK as The Kenny Rogers Singles Album.) Ten Years of Gold topped the US country charts under that title, and as The Kenny Rogers Singles Album, it was just as successful in the United Kingdom.

Chart performance

Weekly charts

Year-end charts

Other versions

The song has been recorded many times by various artists. The Statler Brothers covered it on their 1967 album, Big Country Hits. Other artists who have recorded versions include Bobby Bare, Dale Hawkins, Waylon Jennings, George Jones, Jerry Reed, Roger Miller, Cake, The Killers, Sort Sol, Leonard Nimoy and the German band Wolfsheim.

Several foreign-language versions have been recorded: Greek singer Nana Mouskouri recorded a French version entitled "Ruby, garde ton cœur ici" for her 1970 album Dans le soleil et dans le vent; Gerhard Wendland recorded a German version "Ruby, schau einmal über'n Zaun" in 1970; Pavel Bobek, Czech country singer, recorded "Oh Ruby, nechtěj mi lásku brát" in 1970; Gary Holton and Casino Steel's English-language version was a number one hit in Norway at the beginning of 1982. French singer Eddy Mitchell recorded a French version entitled "Ruby tu reviens au pays" for his 1974 album Rocking in Nashville.

Answer songs
An answer song to "Ruby," entitled "Billy, I've Got to Go to Town," was released in 1969 by Geraldine Stevens, who had previously recorded successfully under the name Dodie Stevens. Sung to the same melody with an arrangement quite similar to the First Edition version, "Billy" peaked at number 117 pop, number 57 country.  It reached number 83 in Canada. In Stevens's song, Ruby affirms her love for her disabled husband, who is named "Billy" in her song whereas  in "Ruby," he is not named.  She pleads in turn for her man to have faith in her fidelity and her commitment to him even in his paralyzed condition.

In 1972, Bobby Womack released the album Understanding, which included the song "Ruby Dean." The lyrics and melody are similar to "Ruby, Don't Take Your Love to Town" but the story is told from the perspective of Ruby's son. The son urges his mother to respect his father and to stop seeing other men. In the original song, no children between the couple are ever mentioned.

In culture

The song is featured prominently in the 1971 West German film Rio das Mortes directed by Rainer Werner Fassbinder.

The song is also quoted repeatedly by Sully, the protagonist of Richard Russo's 1993 novel Nobody's Fool.

"Ruby, Don't Take Your Love to Town " is mentioned in series 1 episode 6 of Victoria Wood's comedy television series dinnerladies.

Video
A "social commentary" video consisting solely of a camera panning back and forth in a bedroom while the song played was shown at the end of a Huntley-Brinkley Report during 1969. Chet Huntley set up the video by linking it to the controversial Vietnam War and the sacrifices made by U.S. servicemen and their families. Chet Huntley and David Brinkley paused after the video and then signed off in their usual fashion.

References

1966 songs
1967 singles
1969 singles
Kenny Rogers songs
Kenny Rogers and The First Edition songs
Number-one singles in Norway
Songs written by Mel Tillis
Johnny Darrell songs
The Killers songs
Song recordings produced by Bob Montgomery (songwriter)
Song recordings produced by Jimmy Bowen